The Unissued Copenhagen Studio Recordings, is an album by saxophonist Warne Marsh's Trio recorded in Denmark in late 1975 but not released on the Storyville label until 1997.

Reception 

The Allmusic review noted "A masterful improviser who stayed creative within the boundaries of advanced chordal improvisation, tenor saxophonist Warne Marsh is heard in excellent form throughout ... This is a rather sparse setting and, despite occasional bass solos, the focus throughout is primarily on Marsh. Fortunately he was in fine form that day and the results are a fine effort".

Track listing 
 "Confirmation" (Charlie Parker) – 4:36
 "I Can't Give You Anything But Love" (Jimmy McHugh, Dorothy Fields) – 5:28
 "Without a Song" (Vincent Youmans, Edward Eliscu, Billy Rose) – 6:57
 "Just One of Those Things" (Cole Porter) – 3:31
 "All the Things You Are" (Jerome Kern, Oscar Hammerstein II) – 5:11
 "I Should Care" (Axel Stordahl, Sammy Cahn, Paul Weston) – 4:27
 "The More I See You" (Harry Warren, Mack Gordon) – 6:28
 "When You're Smiling" (Larry Shay, Mark Fisher, Joe Goodwin) – 2:58
 "Taking a Chance on Love" (Vernon Duke, Ted Fetter, John La Touche) – 3:43
 "Little Willie Leaps" (Miles Davis) – 4:49
 "Ev'ry Time We Say Goodbye" (Cole Porter) – 4:13
 "I Want to Be Happy" (Vincent Youmans, Irving Caesar) – 4:29

Personnel 
Warne Marsh – tenor saxophone
Niels-Henning Ørsted Pedersen – bass
Al Levitt – drums

References 

Warne Marsh albums
1997 albums
Storyville Records albums